Izhevsk State Agricultural Academy is a public university located in Izhevsk, Russia. It was founded in 1931.

History

The Udmurt Academy began its existence as the Moscow Zootechnical Institute of Horse Breeding and Horseracing (MZIKKK), which was established by a decree of the Council of People's Commissars of the USSR dated September 2, 1931. Before the outbreak of World War II, the institute and its archive may have been destroyed, but it may have been closed down. 

On the initiative of S. M. Budyonny in 1943 it was reconstituted as the Moscow Zootechnical Institute of Horse Breeding (MZIK), by the decree of the CPC of the USSR and the Central Committee of the VKP(b) of May 12, 1943.

Based on the Decree of the Council of Ministers of the USSR from August 5, 1954, and the order of the Ministry of Higher Education of the USSR from August 18, 1954, the Moscow Zootechnical Institute of Horse Breeding (MZIK) was transferred to the city of Izhevsk, Udmurt Autonomous Soviet Socialist Republic (UASSR) and was reorganized on September 1, 1954, into the Izhevsk Agricultural Institute (IzhSHI), for the development of the Autonomous Republic.

From that time the higher agricultural education in the Udmurt ASSR started. The students of the zootechnical department (with the 2nd and 3rd year students of the former MZIK who came there) and the newly created agronomical department started studying. Due to the lack of adequate teaching space, classes were held in shifts in the classrooms of the Izhevsk Mechanical Institute. The Republic's leadership decided to give the Institute the building of the Higher Communist Agricultural School named after Postyshev.

From December 27, 1984, to June 19, 1987, it was called Ustinov Agricultural Institute (UstsKhI), later the name Izhevsk Institute was returned, and since 1995 the institute was reorganized and became Izhevsk State Agricultural Academy (IzhSAA).

Structure
 Agronomic
 Zooengineering 
 Power Engineering and Electrification
 Agroengineering
 Economics
 Forestry
 Veterinary Medicine
 Correspondence courses
 Preparatory
 Retraining

Notes and references

Public universities and colleges in Russia
Agricultural universities and colleges in Russia
Izhevsk
Buildings and structures in Udmurtia